This is a list of all tornadoes that were confirmed by local offices of the National Weather Service in the United States from January to March 1990.

January

January 14 event

January 19 event

January 24 event

January 25 event

January 29 event

January 30 event

References

Tornadoes of 1990
1990, 01